Ann C. Wolbert Burgess (born October 2, 1936; middle name also spelled Wolpert) is a researcher whose work has focused on developing ways to assess and treat trauma in rape victims. She is a professor at the William F. Connell School of Nursing at Boston College.

Career
Burgess is a doctorally-prepared, board-certified psychiatric clinical nurse specialist.

She pioneered assessing and treating trauma in rape victims. She co-founded one of the first hospital-based crisis counseling programs at Boston City Hospital with Boston College sociologist, Lynda Lytle Holmstrom. She later consulted John E. Douglas, Robert Ressler, and other FBI agents in the Behavioral Science Unit to develop modern psychological profiling for serial killers. She has provided expert testimony on sexual assault cases.
Burgess has been attributed as the inspiration for the character Dr. Wendy Carr, a psychological consultant for the FBI's Behavioral Science Unit in Netflix's TV series Mindhunter. In an interview with Newsweek, she commented on Carr's character, stating that she emulated several aspects of Burgess' life correctly, aside from Carr's career in psychology as opposed to Burgess' in nursing. When asked why her profession was changed, Burgess said, "I think they felt they had to give this Wendy Carr an occupation or profession that people would understand, and they didn't understand nursing." Burgess also said that, though Carr's character identifies as a lesbian, Burgess does not.

Awards 
She has received multiple awards and distinctions including being named a Living Legend by the American Academy of Nursing (AAN) in October 2016, and receiving the inaugural Ann Burgess Forensic Nursing Award by the International Association of Forensic Nurses in 2009, Sigma Theta Tau International Audrey Hepburn Award, the American Nurses Association Hildegard Peplau Award, and the Sigma Theta Tau International Episteme Laureate Award. She received a Bachelor of Science in Nursing (BSN) from Boston University, a Master of Science in Nursing (MSN) from University of Maryland, and a Doctor of Nursing Science (DNSc) from Boston University.

Selected bibliography
The following is a partial list of Burgess's publications.

Books 

Burgess, Ann Wolbert; Constantine, Steven Matthew (2021). A Killer by Design: Murders, Mindhunters, and My Quest to Decipher the Criminal Mind. Hachette Books. ISBN 9780306924866.

Influence
The Netflix series Mindhunter based the character of Dr. Wendy Carr, portrayed by Anna Torv, directly on Ann Wolbert Burgess. Several liberties were taken with the character of Dr. Carr, including making her a lesbian (Burgess is married to a man and has children) and having her move full-time down to Quantico (Burgess consulted from Boston). In addition, Ann Burgess is not a psychologist but rather a psychiatric nurse practitioner.

References

Burgess named AAN Living Legend - Connell School of Nursing - Boston College 
Professor Ann Burgess is the Mind Behind the Mindhunter 
Ann Wolbert Burgess - Connell School of Nursing - Boston College

External links

1936 births
Living people
American women academics
American women nurses
Boston University School of Nursing alumni
University System of Maryland alumni
Boston College faculty
21st-century American women
Members of the National Academy of Medicine